The Last Street Preacha is the fourth album released by Christian rapper T-Bone. It was released on February 27, 2001 and peaked at No 33 on the Top Heatseekers chart and No 24 on the Billboard Top Contemporary Christian chart. Unlike his previous 90s albums, this album sees T-Bone moving into a more West Coast sound with visible G-funk elements.

Critical response

Adam Greenberg of Allmusic wrote:
"Aside from a couple of forays into the territory of Bone (the Thugs-N-Harmony version) with four-part harmonies, and another thuggish run, the majority of the tracks feature a style that's primarily a poor man's Snoop Dogg. That's not to say T-Bone is bad in any way, though, just not Snoop himself -- the talent and ability are huge here, and the styles range widely from proper West Coast G-funk to high-speed Spanish rap in the reggaeton mold. It's rare to find an artist hidden away in Christian music with this sort of crossover talent, but T-Bone is likely to remain under-recognized by many listeners."

Track listing
 "Intro"
 "Nuttin' 2 Somethin'"
 "Friends"
 "Throw Ya Handz Up"
 "Up On Game"
 "Ride Wit Me"
 "Turn This Up"
 "Wipe Your Tears"
 "Conversion"
 "Street Life"
 "Last Street Preacha"
 "My Dream"
 "Tru 2 Life Playaz"
 "Father Figure"
 "U Don't Know"
 "Livin' Lovely"
 "Mami Linda"

References

2001 albums
T-Bone (rapper) albums
G-funk albums